Xuxa so para Baixinhos 10 is the thirty-third studio album by Brazilian singer and  presenter Xuxa, released by Sony Music on August 29, 2010. It is the tenth album in the Só Para Baixinhos series.

Release and reception
Xuxa só Para Baixinhos 10 - Baixinhos, Bichinhos e + was released on August 29, 2010. It was released in the formats DVD, DVD and CD and Blu-ray, this was the first album of the collection Só Para Baixinhos not to have the physical version in CD. This was the second album in the collection Só Para Baixinhos released by Sony Music, after Xuxa did not renew his contract with the record company Som Livre, in which he had released the first eight volumes of the series. In the year 2011, the album was released on Blu-ray by Sony Music.

Xuxa só Para Baixinhos 10 - Baixinhos, Bichinhos e + sold more than 150,000 copies receiving triple platinum certification, the DVD of this album was one of the best selling of 2010. The singles were "Peito, Estala, Bate", "A Dança do Pinguim" and "Choco Chocolate".

Track listing

Personnel
General and Artistic Direction: Xuxa Meneghel
Direction: Paulo de Barros
Production: Luiz Cláudio Moreira and Mônica Muniz
Production Director: Junior Porto
Musical production: Ary Sperling
Musical Coordination: Vanessa Alves
Cinematography: André Horta
Set design: Lueli Antunes
Art Production: Flávia Cristofaro
Graphic design: Duda Souza and Rodrigo Lima
Stop Motion Animation: Quiá Rodrigues
3D Animation: Valerycka Rizzo
Choreographies: Wagner Menezes (Fly)
Costume: Cristina Gross
Make up: Fábio Morgado
Edition: Tainá Diniz
Finishing: Melissa Flores

Certifications

References

External links 
 Xuxa só para Baixinhos 10 at Discogs

2010 albums
2010 video albums
Xuxa video albums
Xuxa albums
Children's music albums by Brazilian artists
Portuguese-language video albums
Portuguese-language albums
Sony Music albums